The Old Fellwock Auto Company is a building built in 1923 in fine Prairie School style.  It was designed by Shopbell & Company and by Edward J. Thole (who became a partner at Shopbell & Company).

The building is identified by Evansville historic preservation specialists as a "creditable Sullivanesque essay."

It was listed on the U.S. National Register of Historic Places in 1984.

References

Commercial buildings on the National Register of Historic Places in Indiana
Prairie School architecture in Indiana
Commercial buildings completed in 1923
Buildings and structures in Vanderburgh County, Indiana
National Register of Historic Places in Evansville, Indiana